In the 2017–18 rugby union season, the Southern Kings participated in the Pro14 competition, their inaugural appearance in the competition after losing their Super Rugby status after the 2017 season. They finished bottom of the seven-team Conference B, winning just one of their 21 matches. Masixole Banda was the team's top scorer in the competition with 40 points, while winger Yaw Penxe was the top try scorer with five tries.

Personnel

Coaches and management

The Kings coaching and management staff for the 2017–18 Pro14 season were:

Squad

The Kings' squad for the 2017–18 Pro14 is:

Player movements

Player movements between the end of the 2017 Super Rugby season and the end of the 2017–18 Pro14 season are as follows:

Standings

The final Conference B log standings are:

Round-by-round

The table below shows the Kings' progression throughout the season. For each round, their cumulative points total is shown with the conference position:

Matches

The Southern Kings' matches in their inaugural season in Pro14 are:

Player statistics

The Pro14 appearance record for players that represented the Kings in 2017–18 is as follows:

(c) denotes the team captain. For each match, the player's squad number is shown. Starting players are numbered 1 to 15, while the replacements are numbered 16 to 23. "App" refers to the number of appearances made by the player, "Try" to the number of tries scored by the player, "Con" to the number of conversions kicked, "Pen" to the number of penalties kicked, "DG" to the number of drop goals kicked and "Pts" refer to the total number of points scored by the player.

 Njabulo Gumede and CJ Velleman did not make any appearances.

Awards

The following player were honoured at the Southern Kings' end-of-season awards:

See also

 Southern Kings
 Pro14

References

Southern Kings seasons
Southern Kings
Southern Kings
Southern Kings